Euphrosyne usually refers to a Greek goddess, and is a Greek female name; Phroso or Froso is its more common derivative. Euphrosyne may also refer to:

 31 Euphrosyne, one of the largest main belt asteroids
 Boloria euphrosyne, the pearl-bordered fritillary butterfly
 Euphrosyne (plant), a genus of flowering plants
 Euphrosyne, a genus of Polychaete marine worms

People named Euphrosyne
 Eufrosyne Abrahamson (1836–1869), Swedish soprano 
 Euphrosyne of Alexandria (fl. 5th century), legendary virgin
 Euphrosyne (9th century) (c. 790–after 836), Byzantine Empress
 Euphrosyne Angelina, daughter of Byzantine emperor Isaac II Angelus
 Euphrosyne of Opole (died 1292), wife of Casimir I of Kuyavia, and later of Mestwin II, Duke of Pomerania
 Euphrosyne Doukaina Kamatera (1155–1211), Byzantine empress
 Euphrosyne of Kiev (c. 1130–c. 1193), wife of king Géza II of Hungary
 Euphrosyne of Bulgaria (died before 1308), first wife of tzar Theodore Svetoslav of Bulgaria
 Euphrosyne Löf (1772–1828), Swedish actor
 Euphrosyne of Polatsk (1110–1173), Belarusian saint
 Euphrosyne Parepa-Rosa (1836–1874), Scottish soprano
 Saint Euphrosyne of Moscow (died 1407), Grand Duchess of Muscovy
 Julia Nyberg (1784–1854), Swedish poet who wrote under the name of "Euphrosyne"

People with alternate spellings
 Afrosinya (1700–1748), mistress of the son of Peter the Great of Russia
 Eufrosina Cruz (born 1979), Mexican activist
 Countess Palatine Maria Eufrosyne of Zweibrücken (1625–1687)
 Eufrozyna, the Polish form of the name

Other Uses

 Euphrosyne (ship) a paddle steamer created by David Napier for pleasure trips on Loch Lomond in 1830s and 40s.

See also
 Euphrosine, 1790 opera by Étienne Méhul